American Dream is an American drama television series created by Ronald M. Cohen. The series stars George Barrow, Stephen Macht, Karen Carlson, Hans Conried, Michael Hershewe, Timothy Owen Waldrip and Andrea Smith. The series aired on ABC from April 26, 1981, to June 10, 1981.

The series concerned a father (Macht) who worried that his children were learning bigotry and superficial values in the suburbs. So moved his wife, Donna, and three children (teenage Casey and pre-teens Todd and Jenny) to multiracial urban Chicago. There, Donna's father, Sam, moved in.

Although ABC said the show would continue as a 1981-82 midseason replacement, it was pulled from the schedule with two of its initial seven episodes unaired.

The series was developed by Barney Rosenzweig and co-created by Barbara Corday. Both would go on to produce (Rosenzweig) and co-create (Corday) Cagney & Lacey for CBS the following season.

Cast 
Stephen Macht as Danny Novak 
Karen Carlson as Donna Novak
Hans Conried as Abe Berlowitz 
George Barrow as Bill Swartz 
Michael Hershewe as Todd Novak 
Timothy Owen Waldrip as Casey Novak 
Andrea Smith as Jenny Novak 
John McIntire as Sam Whittier

Episodes

References

External links
 

1980s American drama television series
1981 American television series debuts
1981 American television series endings
English-language television shows
American Broadcasting Company original programming
Television series by CBS Studios
Television shows set in Chicago